Omar Rahou (born 19 July 1992), is a Belgian futsal player who plays for Futsal Team Charleroi and the Belgian national futsal team.

References

External links
 
 UEFA profile
 Futsalteam profile

1992 births
Living people
Belgian men's futsal players